Gayda may refer to:

Gayda (newspaper), a 19th-century Bulgarian-language newspaper published in Istanbul
Gayda (surname), a surname
 Gayda, the Turkish spelling of gaida, a bagpipe from the Balkans and Southeast Europe